Mylie Fletcher (23 August 1868 – 25 October 1959) was a Canadian sports shooter. Competing for Canada, he won a silver medal in team trap shooting at the 1908 Summer Olympics in London.

References

1868 births
1959 deaths
Canadian male sport shooters
Olympic shooters of Canada
Olympic silver medalists for Canada
Shooters at the 1908 Summer Olympics
Medalists at the 1908 Summer Olympics
Olympic medalists in shooting
20th-century Canadian people